Farouk Mimouni (born 13 June 2001) is a Tunisian professional footballer who plays for Espérance de Tunis as a left winger.

References

External links

2001 births
Living people
Association football forwards
Espérance Sportive de Tunis players
Tunisian Ligue Professionnelle 1 players
Tunisian footballers